Ralph Whitehead (16 October 1883 – 23 August 1956) was an English cricketer who played first-class cricket for Lancashire from 1908 to 1914. He appeared in 108 first-class matches as a right-handed batsman who bowled right-arm medium fast. He scored 2,578 runs with a highest score of 131 not out among four centuries and took 300 wickets with a best performance of eight for 77.

Whitehead had an eventful first-class debut against Nottinghamshire in 1908. Going to the wicket when Lancashire's score was 117 for 6 in reply to Nottinghamshire's first innings total of 177, he scored 131 not out, adding 188 in two and a quarter hours for the seventh wicket with his captain, A. N. Hornby. When Nottinghamshire went in again, 175 in arrears, Whitehead was no-balled for throwing four times and was taken out of the attack. Whitehead and Hornby were together at the end of the match, making the winning runs.

References

External links
 

 
1883 births
1956 deaths
Cricketers from Ashton-under-Lyne
English cricketers
Lancashire cricketers